Krasnopartizansky is a rural locality (a settlement) in Svetloyarsky District, Volgograd Oblast, Russia. The population was 97 as of 2010. There are 7 streets.

Geography 
Krasnopartizansky is located 70 km southwest of Svetly Yar (the district's administrative centre) by road. Abganerovo is the nearest rural locality.

References 

Rural localities in Svetloyarsky District